The Palio Marinaro di San Pietro is a sporting event of historical re-enactment, established in 1955.

History 
The Palio founded in 1955 just like the Regatta of the Historical Marine Republics.

The Comune of Genoa equipped each of the coastal districts with a 22-palm regatta goiter boat, made of mahogany and cedar wood from Ligurian shipyards: there were 12, about 6.5 meters long and weighing about 300 kilograms, distinguished by a subsequent number, from Ponente to Levante. For each goiter boat there was a crew, strictly of the own rione, consisting of four rowers and a helmsman who guided the boat in the wake, or rowing standing up with two oars. The Sunday of the event, established each year, was the one immediately preceding or following the feast of San Peter and Paul.

There are 12 rioni that challenge in the regatta: Sant'Ilario (Purple), Nervi (Orange), Quinto (Light blue), Quarto (Gray), Sturla (Yellow), Vernazzola (Dark blue), Foce (Red / Blue ), Centro Storico (White / Yellow), Dinegro (White / Blue), Sampierdarena (White / Green), Sestri Pontente (White / Black) and Voltri (Green).

In origin, the Palio took place in the sea water space in front of the Foce beach, then very large, next to the church of San Pietro dedicated to the patron saint of fishermen. Subsequently, the construction of Piazzale Kennedy caused the competition venue to migrate to the waters in front of the San Nazaro bathing establishment.
In 1986 the wooden goiters were replaced by the current 5.5 meters long fiberglass goiters and weighing about 200 kilograms.

The twelve rioni  
 Sant'Ilario (Purple)
 Nervi (Orange)
 Quinto (Light blue)
 Quarto (Gray)
 Sturla (Yellow)
 Vernazzola (Dark blue)
 Foce (Red / Blue)
 Centro Storico (White / Yellow)
 Dinegro (White / Blue)
 Sampierdarena (White / Green)
 Sestri Pontente (White / Black) 
 Voltri (Green)

The historical parade 
The historic parade is scheduled on the Saturday preceding Sunday's race.

The race 
The Palio takes place in the stretch of sea in front of the church of San Pietro at Foce, a district of Genoa.
The fiberglass goiters have a crew of four rowers and a coxswain in the race.

On 3 July 2022, only seven Genoese rioni: Sant'Ilario-Capolungo (purple), Nervi (orange), Quinto (light blue), Sturla-Vernazzola (blue),  Foce (blue and red), Sestri Ponente (black and white) and Voltri (green) raced in the 62nd Palio Marinaro di San Pietro  covering 1 nautical mile, composed of 6 turning points.

The seven rioni  
 Sant'Ilario-Capolungo  
 Nervi  
 Quinto  
 Sturla-Vernazzola  
 Foce  
 Sestri Ponente  
 Voltri

The trophy 
The trophy Andrea Doria awarded the winning crew is a reproduction of the ancient door-knocker represent Neptune, from the Palazzo del Principe's northern entrance.

Winners

See also
 Regatta of the Historical Marine Republics

References

External links
Il Palio di San Pietro

Genoa
Boat races
Italian traditions
Festivals in Italy
Tourist attractions in Liguria
Sport in Liguria
July sporting events
Historical competitions of Italy